Marie Poissonnier (born 4 May 1979 in Clermont-Ferrand, Puy-de-Dôme) is a female pole vaulter from France. Her personal best jump is 4.46 metres, achieved in July 2002 in Saint-Etienne.

She finished twelfth at the 1999 IAAF World Indoor Championships in Maebashi and won the bronze medal at the 2001 Mediterranean Games in Tunis. Participating at the 2004 Olympics, she failed to qualify from her pool.

Competition record

External links

1979 births
Living people
French female pole vaulters
Athletes (track and field) at the 2000 Summer Olympics
Athletes (track and field) at the 2004 Summer Olympics
Olympic athletes of France
Sportspeople from Clermont-Ferrand
Mediterranean Games bronze medalists for France
Mediterranean Games medalists in athletics
Athletes (track and field) at the 2001 Mediterranean Games